Cangyuan Washan Airport  is an airport serving Cangyuan Va Autonomous County in Lincang, Yunnan province, southwest China. The airport is located in Nuoliang Township and opened in December 2016.

History
Construction of the airport began on 20 December 2013, with an estimated total investment of 1.589 billion yuan. Cangyuan Washan Airport opened on 8 December 2016 with the arrival of a Lucky Air flight from Kunming, the capital of the province. The airport supports tourism in the county; it is closer than Lincang Airport, originally the only airport in Lincang, to Wengding Wa village, a popular tourist attraction.

Facilities
The airport has one runway that measures .

Airlines and destinations

See also
List of airports in China
List of the busiest airports in China

References

Airports in Yunnan
Airports established in 2016
2016 establishments in China
Transport in Lincang